Sanya is both a given name and a surname. Notable people with the name include:

Given name:
Sanya Richards-Ross
Sanya Mateyas
Sanya Tulasyan
Sanya Dharmasakti, Prime Minister of Thailand
Sanya Lopez (born 1996 as Shaira Lenn Osuna Roberto), Filipino actress

Surname:
Arinola Olasumbo Sanya (born 1953), professor of physiotherapy

Fictional characters:
Sanya V. Litvyak, character in the mixed-media project Strike Witches

See also
 Sania
 Sanja
 Shania (given name)